Rasoul Montajabnia (born 13 July 1948 in Shiraz) is an Iranian reformist politician, jurist, vice president and founding member of the National Trust Party (Iran). He is also a former member of the Assembly of Combatant Clergymen and director of the University of jurisprudence controls.

Rasoul Montajabnia was representative first three periods of parliament, head of the parliamentary defense committee Third, the representative of the Islamic Republic Imam Khomeini and the head of the national Iran police, an adviser to President Khatami, vice president of Command Seal of Command and General Staff of Defense, a member of the Islamic Republic of Iran and the representative of the Supreme Leader Iran's Islamic community were teachers.

References

External links 
 Rasul Montajabnia's personal web site

National Trust Party (Iran) politicians
Living people
People from Shiraz
1948 births
Association of Combatant Clerics politicians
Islamic Republican Party politicians
Presidential advisers of Iran